Joachim Wagner (13 April 1690 – 23 May 1749) was an important Brandenburg organ builder.

Origin 
Wagner was born as the son of the pastor Christoph Wagner (1653-1709) and his wife Anna Dorothea née Tiefenbach in Karow, Duchy of Magdeburg. His brothers, the pastors Johann Christoph Wagner (1683-1750, since 1710 his father's successor in office in Karow), and Friedrich Wagner (1693-1760), later had an influence on his work.

Work 

It is possible that Wagner learned the organ building trade from Schnitger's student Matthäus Hartmann (died ca. 1745). Evidence shows that Christoph Treutmann the Elder (c. 1673-1757) in Magdeburg was Wagner's teacher. As a journeyman, Wagner went on the road and also worked for Gottfried Silbermann in Freiberg for two years. He came to Berlin  in 1719. He completed his masterpiece there in 1723 with the organ in the St. Mary's Church, Berlin (already consecrated in 1721), which had three manuals and 40 stops. In Berlin, he also built his largest work with 50 stops on three manuals in the newly built Berliner Garnisonkirche between 1724 and 1726. (rebuilt in 1892, burned in 1908).

He was by far the most important organ builder of the Baroque period in the Margraviate of Brandenburg, as conditions were particularly favourable during the reign of the Soldier King Frederick William I of Prussia (1713-1740) offered favourable conditions for this. He is sometimes referred to as the "Märkischer Silbermann".

Wagner apparently died in Salzwedel while working on his last organ for the Marienkirche there at age 59, as it was completed by Gottlieb Scholtze.

Students 
Among his pupils who continued his traditions were:
 Matthias Kallensee, since 1720, later Werkmeister, died in 1741.
 Johann Peter Migendt, since 1731/32, since 1741 Werkmeister, took over the workshop in 1749 (c. 1703- 1767)
 Heinrich Andreas Contius, 1732 to about 1738, thereafter most important organ builder in the Baltic (1708- 1795)
 Georg Neumann, 1732-1742
 Gottlieb Scholtze, 1740/44 carving for Wagner, afterwards organ builder's pupil (c. 1713- c. 1782)
 Johann Gottlieb Mehnert, at the latest since 1746, afterwards organ builder in Stettin
 Ernst Julius Marx, possibly only with Migendt after 1749?, afterwards organ builder in Berlin

Organs

Sphere of influence 
In the course of his life, Wagner built over 50 individually designed organs, both for large churches and for smaller village churches, of which 15 have been preserved in larger parts, as well as eight cases or smaller remnants.

From his workshop in Berlin, his sphere of activity extended mainly to the northern German Prussian Hohenzollern states, in addition to the residential cities of Berlin (8 organs) and Potsdam (4) and Brandenburg an der Havel (3) to the entire Margraviate of Brandenburg including Altmark (Werben (Elbe), Salzwedel), Uckermark (Angermünde, Gramzow, Schwedt/Oder) and Neumark (Königsberg), in Pomerania (Stargard, Wartin) and the Duchy of Magdeburg. But also in Kursachsen (Jüterbog) and Norway (Nidaros Cathedral in Trondheim) he built organs. Today, 15 organs with the largest original components have been preserved, the most valuable in the St. Peter and Paul Cathedral Brandenburg, as well as 8 cases or smaller remains.

Characteristics 
Wagner built instruments that combined and further developed Central German and North German elements of organ building. However, the work principle cultivated in the baroque period of northern Germany was abandoned in favour of sound fusion and a single overall case. The sound characteristics include the powerful intonation, the well-staffed pedal keyboard (without pedal coupler),  mixtures and the manual transmissions built into some instruments.

In the course of his life he built over fifty individually designed organs, both for large churches and for small village churches, no two of which were completely alike. His casings were rich in variation, often bearing sculptural decoration and occasionally moving timpani and trumpet angels in the Silesian tradition, inspired by Johann Michael Röder. All of these instruments are extremely valuable testimonies to a highly developed musical culture, which were also used by the musical greats of their time. On 8 May 1747, for example, Johann Sebastian Bach played the relatively small Wagner organ at Potsdam's . The organ works of his son Carl Philipp Emanuel Bach were written in the context of the organ built in 1755 by Ernst Marx and Peter Migendt.  of the princess Anna Amalia, which is now located in Karlshorst.

Today's holdings 
Fires, lack of maintenance as well as alterations resulting from the musical zeitgeist of the 19th  century and the consequences of the Second World War have left only 15 more or less originally preserved instruments and eight other instrument remnants, mainly cases (some still with original stock). The Potsdam firm  has rendered great service to the restoration of Wagner organs in the course of its existence.

On 26 August 2006, the Joachim Wagner Society was founded in Rühstädt with the aim of researching and maintaining his unique heritage.

List of works 
Today, 51 new organs, one disposition design, four conversions and some repairs are known from Wagner. 15 organs in larger parts and eight pipe organs are preserved, some with small remains. The most important preserved one is located in the St. Peter and Paul Cathedral in Brandenburg.

The size of the instruments is indicated in the fifth column by the number of manuals and the number of sounding stops in the sixth column. A capital P stands for an independent pedal, a small p for an attached pedal. An italicisation indicates that the organ in question is no longer preserved or that only the facade is still by Wagner.

References

Further reading 
 Heinz Herbert Steves: Der Orgelbauer Joachim Wagner (1690–1749). In Archiv für Musikforschung 4, 1939,  and 5, 1940, . Auch Sonderdruck als Diss. phil. (Cologne 1939): Leipzig 1939.
 Arthur Jaenicke: Der reine Klang. Eine Erzählung aus dem Leben des Orgelbauers Joachim Wagner. Evangelische Verlagsanstalt, Berlin 1957. (With biographical introduction, overview of known Wagner organs and glossary on organ building.)
 Claus-Peter Schulze: Wagner, Joachim. In Die Musik in Geschichte und Gegenwart. Vol. 14, 1968, .
 Gernot Schmidt: Die Orgeln von Joachim Wagner und ihre Restaurierungen. In The Organ Yearbook. 11, 1980, .
 Wolf Bergelt: Die Mark Brandenburg. Eine wiederentdeckte Orgellandschaft. Berlin 1989,  and 104–106.
 Eitelfriedrich Thom (ed.): Der Orgelbauer Joachim Wagner (1690–1749). Michaelstein / Blankenburg 1990.
 Berthold Schwarz (ed.): 500 Jahre Orgeln in Berliner evangelischen Kirchen. Berlin 1991, vol. I,  and vol. II, .
 Andreas Kitschke: Die Orgelbauten von Joachim Wagner (1690–1749) in der Residenzstadt Potsdam.In Acta Organologica. 23, 1993, . [Mit Werkliste und Abbildungen.]
 Wolf Hobohm, Friedrich Wagner: Notizen über einen Hamburger Hauptpastor aus der Sicht der Telemann-Forschung. In Musikkultur in Schlesien zur Zeit von Telemann und Dittersdorf. Sinzig 2001, .
 Dietrich Kollmannsperger: Wagner, Joachim. In The New Grove Dictionary of Music and Musicians. Vol. 26. 2nd edition. London, New York 2002, .
 : Bibliographie zur Geschichte der Orgel in Berlin-Brandenburg. 2., aktualisierte Auflage (elektronische Ressource). Rühstädt 2005.
 Uwe Czubatynski: Geschichte und Restaurierung der Wagner-Orgel in Rühstädt. In Mitteilungen des . 6, 2006, .
 Wolf Bergelt: Joachim Wagner (1690–1749) Orgelmacher. Schnell und Steiner, Regensburg 2012, .

External links 

 
 
 Joachim Wagner auf Orgellandschaft Brandenburg

German pipe organ builders
1690 births
1749 deaths
People from Saxony-Anhalt